Leda Serene Films is a film, television, and theatre production company based in Toronto, Canada, owned by filmmaker and producer Frances-Anne Solomon.

The company has produced award-winning cross-platform projects from feature films, and creative documentaries, to original theatre plays.

Recent projects include A Winter Tale, Lord Have Mercy!, a sitcom, for Vision TV, Toronto 1, APTN and Showcase and Literature Alive, a multi-faceted multimedia project showcasing Caribbean Canadian literature through documentaries, audio books, radio programs and an educational website.

Filmography
 A Winter Tale, 2007, Feature Film.
 LiteratureAlive, Seasons 1 & 2, 2005–6, 20-part TV Series 
 Lord Have Mercy!, 2001–3, Sitcom Series.
 Speak Like a Child, 1998, Feature Film 
 What My Mother Told Me, 1996, Feature Film 
 Siren Spirits, 1995, Short Film Series. 
 Reunion: West Indian Women at War, 1993, Documentary.
 I Is a Long Memoried Woman, 1990, Documentary Feature

Awards 
A Winter Tale launched the ReelWorld Film Festival 2007, and won the Tonya Lee Williams Award for Outstanding Canadian Feature, as well as Special Mention in the Outstanding Screenplay category. 
What My Mother Told Mepremiered at the Toronto International Film Festival in 1996, and has won awards at The Festival of Black International Cinema (Berlin, St Louis, Paris), "Best Film Depicting The Black Experience", and at Martha's Vineyard African American Film Festival 2006, HBO Best Feature Award.

The Literature Alive documentary series won a Special Recognition Award for "Memory Places" at The Festival of Black International Cinema, and the Audience Award for "Blood Dub and The Matriarch" at the San Diego Women's Film Festival.

Lord Have Mercy! was nominated for 2 Gemini Awards - for Best Comedy Series and Best Individual Performance (for Leonie Forbes).

Bideshi won Best Short Feature at the Bombay International Film Festival, 1996.

I Is A Long Memoried Woman won the Gold Award for Television Performing Arts,  at the New York International Film & Television Festival 1991. The BBC Radio version  won Best Feature Documentary, at the  Sony Radio Awards 1991, and was nominated for a Prix Futura for most Innovative Radio Feature.

External links
 Leda Serene Films

Film production companies of Canada
Television production companies of Canada